Samuels bok (lit. Samuel's Book) is a 1981 novel by Swedish author Sven Delblanc. It won the Nordic Council's Literature Prize in 1982.

References

1981 Swedish novels
Swedish-language novels
Nordic Council's Literature Prize-winning works
Novels set in Sweden
Novels set in the 19th century